The FIVB Beach Volleyball World Tour (known between 2003 and 2012 as the FIVB Beach Volleyball Swatch World Tour for sponsorship reasons) was the worldwide professional beach volleyball tour for both men and women organized by the  (FIVB), the sport's global governing body. The World Tour was introduced 1989 for men and in 1992 for women being held yearly since then until 2021 when it was replaced by the new Volleyball World Beach Pro Tour.

Several tournaments were staged throughout the year. All athletes who competed in the qualifying and main draws of the tournaments earned points in the FIVB Beach Volleyball World Rankings, and after the last stage the pair that accumulated the most points during the year was declared the champion of the World Tour (only points from 75% of the tournaments in the season were considered for the ranking). Winning the World Tour was considered to be one of the highest honours in international beach volleyball, being surpassed only by the World Championships, and the Beach Volleyball tournament at the Summer Olympic Games. The Tour was historically dominated by Brazilian teams.

History
The international professional tour was originally known as the FIVB Beach Volleyball World Series, and began in 1989 for men and 1992 for women. It was rebranded as the FIVB Beach Volleyball World Tour in 1997. The World Tour was previously accompanied by FIVB Challenger and Satellite events, which served as a developmental circuit for up-and-coming players. The FIVB handed over the organizing of Challenger and Satellite events to the continental confederations in 2009.

Tournaments in the World Tour were previously categorized as either Grand Slams, Majors or Opens. This was replaced by the star rating structure in 2017.

FIVB established the Volleyball World Beach Pro Tour in October 2021 to replace the World Tour, starting with the inaugural 2022 edition.

Tournament categories
The star ranking tournament structure was introduced in 2017. World Tour tournaments were ranked from 1 to 5 stars, with 5-star tournaments offering the most prize money. The 2018 World Tour had 47 international tournaments with a total prize purse of over US$7 million. Competing in the World Tour as well as other FIVB-recognized tournaments such as the Summer Olympics allowed players to earn FIVB Ranking Points, with higher-star events being worth more points. The World Tour concluded with the World Tour Finals at the end of each season.

History

Champions

FIVB World Tour Finals
The Tour Finals were the season-ending championships of the FIVB World Tour and featured only the top performing teams during the regular season. The tournament was first held in 2015.

Men's Results

Women's Results

Award winners

Men's FIVB World Tour award winners

Women's FIVB World Tour award winners

Sponsorship
  Swatch
  Red Bull
  Sony

References

Sources
Awards, Beach Volleyball Database
2007Women's Post-season Awards at FIVB.org
2007Men's Post-season Awards at FIVB.org

External links
Official site

 
Beach volleyball competitions
Sports competition series
Multi-national professional sports leagues